Sindooram is a traditional vermilion red or orange-red coloured cosmetic powder from the Indian subcontinent, usually worn by married women along the part of their hairline. In Hindu communities the sindoor is a visual marker of marital status of a woman and ceasing to wear it usually implies widowhood.

The main component of traditional sindooram is usually cinnabar (cinnabar is mercury sulfide, a toxic mineral), turmeric and lime. Some commercial sindoor products contain synthetic ingredients, some of which are not manufactured to proper standards and may contain lead.

Application of sindoor

Sindoor is traditionally applied at the beginning or completely along the parting-line of a woman’s hair (also called mang in Hindi or simandarekha in Sanskrit) or as a dot on the forehead. Sindoor is the mark of a married woman in Hinduism. Single women wear the bindi in different colours for special occasions but don't apply sindoor in their parting of the hairline. Widows do not wear sindoor or bindis, signifying that their husband is no longer alive.

The sindoor is first applied to the woman by her husband on the day of her wedding; this is called the Sindoor Daanam ceremony. After this, she applies it herself every day.

A similar colouring ritual is known as pasupu kumkuma, named after another name for sindoor, kumkuma.

The wiping off of the sindoor is very significant for a widow. There are many rituals associated with this practice. The most common is when a mother-in-law or older sister-in-law wipes off the sindoor when a woman becomes a widow. The widow will break her bangles and remove her bindi as well, and many will also remove their nose ring and toe rings. The parting of hair is symbolic of a river of red blood full of life. When the sindoor is removed then the river becomes barren, dry and empty. This custom is prevalent in rural areas and is followed by all castes and social ranks.

The red sindoor is significant for the married woman as she is full of colour. When she becomes a widow she adopts plain white dress and removes all colour from her face including the bright red sindoor.

Methods and styles of applying the sindoor vary from personal choice to regional customs. Many new brides will fill the whole hair line with sindoor, while other married women may just apply a red spot at the end of the hair line and forehead. Recently, a triangle shape on the forehead pointing towards the nose, with a diamond bindi for fashion, is being worn by younger women.

Hinduism
Neolithic female figurines excavated at Mehrgarh, Baluchistan seem to imply application of sindoor-like colour to the parting of women's hair. According to the legends, Radha the consort of Lord Krishna turned the kumkum into a flame-like design on her forehead. In the famous epic Mahabharata, Draupadi the wife of the Pandavas wipes off her sindoor in disgust and despair at the happenings in Hastinapura. Use of sindoor is frequently mentioned in the puranas Lalitha Sahasranama and Soundarya Lahari.

Adi Shankaracharya writes in Soundarya Lahari:

Jain women apply the sindoor, mostly in the cities. Jain nuns are forbidden to apply this to their hair line or foreheads. The display of the sindoor is considered very important to indicate the married status of the groom, whereas in several local cultures, sindooram is applied on their hair partings by unmarried women.

Application of sindoor is essentially a Hindu tradition. In the 19th century, Sufi leader Sharafuddin Maneri encouraged Muslim women to apply sindoor in Bangladesh. This was severely condemned by reformist movements.

Ayurvedic medicine
There are various forms of Sindhoor mentioned in Ayurveda. Traditional sindhoor is made from natural ingredients used for facial makeup (cosmetics). Most widely used traditional Sindhoor is made from turmeric and lime juice. Other ingredients include Ghee, and slaked lime. This is also called Kumkum. Sindhoor is also made from red sandal powder, saffron etc. The coloured powders sold as substitutes are traditionally not considered sindhoor.

Toxicity concerns

Traditional sindoor was made with turmeric and alum or lime, or from other herbal ingredients. Unlike red lead and vermilion, these are not poisonous. Modern material being sold as sindhoor mainly uses vermilion, an orange-red pigment, the purified and powdered form of cinnabar, which is the chief form in which mercury sulfide naturally occurs. As with other compounds of mercury, sindoor is toxic and must be handled carefully. Sometimes, red lead (lead tetroxide, also known as minium) is added to sindoor. Red lead is toxic.  In early 2008, allegations of high lead content led the U.S. Food and Drug Administration to recall batches of sindoor from several manufacturers.

In popular culture

There are many Indian movies and dramas involving sindoor, with their themes revolving around the ritual's significance.  These include Sindoor (1947), Sindooram (1976), Rakta Sindhuram (1985), Sindoor (1987), and  Sindoor Tere Naam Ka (series, 2005–2007).

See also
 Bindi
 Tilaka
 Vermilion
 Mangala sutra

References

External links

Cosmetics
Hairdressing
Marriage in Hinduism